DE9  Closer to the Edit is a 2001 compilation album by Canadian electronic music artist Richie Hawtin.

Spin named it one of the 20 best albums of 2001. Resident Advisor placed it at number 16 on its list of the top 50 mixes of the 2000s.

Track listing

References

Further reading

External links
 
 

2001 albums
Richie Hawtin albums
Novamute Records albums